Ernest Hanks (April 1888 – October 1965) was an English professional footballer who played in the Football League for Woolwich Arsenal as a centre forward.

Personal life 
Between 1904 and 1906, Hanks served in a militia battalion of the Princess Charlotte of Wales's (Royal Berkshire Regiment). He served as a corporal in the Army Service Corps during the First World War.

Career statistics

References

External links 
 Ernest Hanks at arsenal.com

English footballers
Brentford F.C. players
English Football League players
Southern Football League players
1888 births
1965 deaths
Association football forwards
Arsenal F.C. players
Southend United F.C. players
Royal Army Service Corps soldiers
Association football goalkeepers
Royal Berkshire Regiment soldiers
British Army personnel of World War I
Military personnel from Surrey